Olivia E. Raymond who writes under the pen name Zelda Knight or Author Z. Knight is an American writer and editor who is chiefly known as the co-editor of Dominion: An Anthology of Speculative Fiction From Africa and the African Diaspora and Africa Risen. She is the publisher of Aurelia Leo, a speculative fiction publisher based in Louisville.

Life 
Knight holds an MA in Public History from the University of Louisville and is currently post-doctorate student in Pan-African Studies from the same school.

Bibliography 
 Dominion: An Anthology of Speculative Fiction From Africa and the African Diaspora
 African Risen

Awards and nominations 
She won the British Fantasy Award for "Best Anthology" in 2021 for Dominion. She was a nominee for "Best Anthology" category at the 2021 Locus Awards for Dominion. and the 2020 This Is Horror awards.
In 2023, Africa Risen was nominated for the 54th NAACP Image Awards for Outstanding Literary Work.

References

External links 
  

Living people
African-American novelists
African-American short story writers
African-American women writers
Afrofuturist writers
Black speculative fiction authors
Year of birth missing (living people)